Samir (variantly spelled Sameer) is a male name found commonly in India, the Middle East, Central Asia and Europe. In Sanskrit, Samīr/समीर translates to the "wind, air or breeze". In Arabic, Samir means holy, jovial, loyal or charming. In Albanian, it translates literally as “so good” but the connotation is closer to exquisite, superb or perfect. Samira is the feminine spelling, also found in both languages.

Fictional entities 
Samir Duran/Emil Narud, a character in the StarCraft series

People with the name

Given name

Artists and musicians
Samir (filmmaker), Samir Jamal al Din / Jamal Aldin, a Swiss film maker of Iraqi origin
Samir Badran, Swedish television personality and singer, part of duo Samir & Viktor
Samir Chamas, Lebanese actor, writer and voice actor
Samir Ghanem, Egyptian comedian
Samir Soni, Indian actor

Politicians
Samir Allioui, Dutch politician
Samir Frangieh, Lebanese politician
Samir Geagea, Lebanese politician
Samir Kassir, Lebanese politician
Samir Mouqbel (born 1939), Lebanese politician
Samir Saïed, Tunisian politician
Samir Sharifov, Azerbaijani politician
Sameer Zuberi, Canadian politician

Sportsmen
Samir Ayass (born 1990), Lebanese footballer
Samir Bannout, Lebanese bodybuilder
Samir Bekrić, Bosnian footballer
Samir Fazlagić, Norwegian footballer
Samir Fazli, Macedonian footballer
Samir Hadji, Moroccan footballer
Samir Handanovič, Slovenian footballer
Samir Karabašić, Bosnian canoeist
Samir Mammadov, Azerbaijani boxer
Samir Merzić, Bosnian footballer
Samir Nasri, French footballer
Semir Slomić, Bosnian footballer
Semir Tuce, Bosnian footballer
Samir Ujkani, Albanian footballer
Samir Ziani, French boxer

Others
Samir El-Khadem, Lebanese former Commander of the Lebanese Naval Forces
Samir Khader, Iraqi journalist
Samir Mehanović, British film director
Samir Naji Al Hasan Moqbel, Yemeni guantanamo detainee
Samir Naqqash, Israeli writer
Semir Zeki, British neuroscientist

Middle name
Hélder Samir Lopes Semedo Fernandes, Cape Verdean footballer known simply as Samir Ali

Nickname
Ajam Boujarari Mohammed, Moroccan football manager known as Samir

Ships
 A ship built in 1933, originally a German fishing trawler named Carl Röver, which operated under the name Samir as a Lebanese cargo ship from 1980 to 1985

See also
Sameer (disambiguation)
Samira, an Arabic female given name

References

Arabic masculine given names
Bosniak masculine given names
Indian masculine given names
Iranian masculine given names
Azerbaijani masculine given names